Iyengar may be:

 Iyengar, an Indian caste
 B. K. S. Iyengar, founder of Iyengar Yoga
 Geeta Iyengar, daughter of Iyengar, "the world's leading female yoga teacher"
 Shanto Iyengar, American political scientist
 Sundaraja Sitharama Iyengar, a US-based computer scientist

See also
 List of Iyengars